Vengeance on Varos is the second serial of the 22nd season of the British science fiction television series Doctor Who, which was first broadcast in two weekly parts on 19 and 26 January 1985.

The serial is set on the planet Varos, where the Sixth Doctor (Colin Baker) and Peri (Nicola Bryant) find themselves in a dystopian world in which torture and executions are broadcast to the public as entertainment, and the alien mining representative Sil (Nabil Shaban) is extorting the planet's Governor (Martin Jarvis) into selling the valuable ore Zeiton-7 to his company cheaply.

Plot

While repairing the TARDIS console, the Sixth Doctor finds that the TARDIS has unexpectedly stopped in deep space and he can do nothing to fix it. Peri locates the TARDIS manual and presents it to the Doctor who dismisses it, as he knows perfectly well that transitional elements within the TARDIS have stopped producing orbital energy and only Zeiton-7 ore can realign the power systems. But as the Doctor explains, Zeiton-7 is exceptionally rare and only comes from one planet in the Cetes constellation: Varos.

On Varos, originally a prison planet that now functions as a government system where voting is mandatory and torture and executions are televised, the Galatron Mining Corporation's swindling Mentor representative Sil is negotiating with Varos's Governor over the price of Zeiton-7 ore. Wanting a fair price for his people, and unaware that his Chief Officer is in league with Sil, the governor addresses his people to vote if they should hold out longer for a fair price. However, the popular vote is against the Governor, and as a consequence, he is subjected to exposure to potentially lethal Human Cell Disintegration Bombardment. As losing a subsequent vote will almost surely kill him, the Governor is forced to please the citizens by ordering the execution of a rebel leader named Jondar. By this time, the Doctor has managed to repair the TARDIS sufficiently and arrives at Varos's Punishment Dome close to where Jondar is to be executed.

The guard stationed at the execution believes the TARDIS and its occupants are a hallucination resulting from the psychological effects of the Dome, which allows the Doctor and Peri to incapacitate the guard and free Jondar. But with their way back to the TARDIS blocked by more guards, the three flee, meeting up with Jondar's wife Areta. Venturing through the Punishment Dome to find another route to the TARDIS, the Doctor is separated from the others, who are arrested. With his attempt to escape now being broadcast as entertainment to all of Varos, he enters a corridor that appears in his mind as a desert, and due to its psychological effects, begins to die from thirst. By this time, Peri has been brought to the control centre in the company of the Governor, Sil and the other officers.

They question Peri as she watches the Doctor's body being taken away to an acid bath for disposal. However, the Doctor has survived, and though he escapes, causing the death of two guards in the process, he is quickly arrested by Quillam, Varos's chief scientist. The Governor decrees that the Doctor and Jondar will be executed by hanging, while Peri and Areta are to be subjected to horrific scientific experiments at the hands of Quillam and his cell mutator. At the gallows, at the last moment, the Doctor questions the Governor about Sil and his extortion while offering to help in the Zeiton-7 matter, causing Sil to order his bodyguards to rush the platform to pull the lever to silence the Doctor. But it turns out the execution was actually a farce to extract information out of the Doctor. The Doctor, who suspected this, agrees to help Varos on the condition that Peri and Areta are returned unharmed. However, Quillam refuses, even under duress, forcing the Doctor to resort to shooting the entire control panel. Luckily, the process has been halted in time, and the mutations are only temporary, and Peri and Areta soon return to their original selves. The four then escape back into the depths of the Punishment Dome towards a possible escape route before Peri, still in a stupor after the effects of the mutator, is recaptured and taken to the control centre.

The Chief Officer and Sil make their final move on the Governor in hopes that losing the next vote will finally kill him, securing the way for them to control Varos and the Zeiton-7 ore. Meanwhile, the Doctor, Jondar, and Areta make their way into the End Game of the Dome and the supposed exit. The vote starts and the bombardment begins, but the guard Meldak has a change of heart and stops the device, saving the Governor and Peri. The three then make their way to meet up with the Doctor.

The Doctor's group is then chased by two cannibals, but loses them thanks to some deadly plant tendrils. The Chief and Quillam arrive on the scene but are entangled in the tendrils, killing them. The group then meet up with Peri, the Governor, and Meldak. They all make their way back to the control centre as Sil reveals the invasion force he had dispatched hours earlier to take Varos by force. However, Sil is mortified to learn that the invasion force has been called back, and a second Zeiton-7 deposit has been discovered, so his company has ordered him to obtain the Varosian ore at any price. The Doctor and Peri then bid the Governor farewell, taking some ore with them for the TARDIS. Soon after, the Governor issues a message to the citizens to abolish their government's injustice, torture, and executions. Citizens watch in disbelief, wondering what they should do now with their new-found freedom.

Production

This story was written as a replacement for a serial called Song of the Space Whale by comics writer Pat Mills, which was originally scheduled to be in season 20, before finally being cancelled. Working titles for this story included Domain and Planet of Fear (the latter being vetoed for being too similar to the previous season's Planet of Fire).

The story was first written for the 1982 season, but was repeatedly pushed back and re-written. In its final draft, the story had a number of comedic sequences, most of which wound up being cut, and one of which, the acid bath sequence, was played seriously. The result was that the final story was much darker than originally intended. The more grim acid bath sequence was much criticised for its tone and for the Doctor's flippant remark at the end of the scene.

During the first recording of the noose execution scene, part of the set collapsed under the weight of the actors. Fortunately, this did not happen when Baker and Connery actually had their necks in the nooses (although in that case, for safety reasons the nooses were not actually tied up).

In his 1986 interview for Starburst, script editor Eric Saward said he thought this story was "poorly directed".

Cast notes
Jason Connery (Jondar) is the son of actor Sean Connery. Martin Jarvis makes a guest appearance as the beleaguered Governor of Varos; he had previously appeared in the series in a story in each of the previous two decades: The Web Planet (1965) and Invasion of the Dinosaurs (1974). Subsequent to Vengeance On Varos, Jarvis as a different character reunited with Colin Baker in the Big Finish story Jubilee.
After Jubilee, Jarvis appeared in the Torchwood BBC radio play The Devil and Miss Carew.

Nabil Shaban features as Sil, who would return in the next season's The Trial of a Time Lord. Stephen Yardley (Arak) previously played Sevrin in Genesis of the Daleks (1975). Owen Teale (Maldak) later appeared as Evan Sherman in the Torchwood episode "Countrycide" (2006). He also played Hayton in the audio play The Mind's Eye.

Sheila Reid later played Clara Oswald's Gran in "The Time of the Doctor" (2013) and "Dark Water" (2014).

Broadcast and reception

Vengeance on Varos reflected the media's contemporary concern over video nasties and snuff movies and provoked considerable controversy for its violent content. The scenes featuring acid bath deaths, attempted hangings and genetic experiments on the female characters were widely criticised in the Radio Times letters page, and the programme Points of View. Unlike previous criticisms of the show's violence, this time complaints about Vengeance on Varos were raised by members of the general public and some of the show's fans, as well as traditional critics such as Mary Whitehouse.

Reviewing the story in About Time, Tat Wood described it as "like channel-zapping between a radical fringe theatre and children's television". He praised Martin's script and the story's production design, stating the story "gets more marks for effort than anything else this year". Wood also suggested that if someone wanted to understand what it was like to be living in Thatcher's Britain, they should watch Vengeance on Varos, then to "imagine a world where this could be followed by Jim'll Fix It". In Doctor Who: The Complete Guide, Mark Campbell awarded Vengeance on Varos six out of ten, describing it as "a brave idea, hindered by a plodding narrative and wooden performances". He also thought the "notorious acid bath scene" was "deeply problematic". Patrick Mulkern of Radio Times awarded it four stars out of five, describing Nabil Shaban's Sil as "one of the most effective new Doctor Who monsters in ages". He found that Jason Connery was "struggling through cumbersome dialogue" but felt there were "several weaker performances on display", though he praised Martin Jarvis as "graceful and suitably subdued". He was also critical of the acid bath scene, considering it "unfunny, unDoctorly and should have been changed at script stage". While describing Ron Jones as "not the greatest director", Mulkern believed it was "one of the more polished productions of his career".

Commercial releases

In print

A novelisation of this serial, written by Philip Martin, was published by Target Books in January 1988. It was originally planned to be released 2 years earlier, but was pushed back after delays in the delivery of the manuscript by Philip Martin. However, it kept its original number of 106. In addition, although Target had launched a new cover design format for the books with the previous volume, Time and the Rani, reflecting the new series logo of the Sylvester McCoy era, Vengeance on Varos was published with the earlier book cover format using the neon-tube logo of the Baker-Davison era.

In 1997 the novel was also issued by BBC Audio as an audio book, read by Colin Baker.

Home media
Vengeance on Varos was released on VHS in the UK in 1993 as part of the Doctor Who 30th Anniversary celebrations. It was released on DVD in the UK on 15 October 2001. The DVD commentary is provided by actors Colin Baker (The Doctor), Nicola Bryant (Peri), and Nabil Shaban (Sil). This serial was also released as part of the Doctor Who DVD Files in issue 68 on 10 August 2011. A Special Edition DVD was released on 10 September 2012.

In 2013 it was released on DVD again as part of the "Doctor Who: The Doctors Revisited 5-8" box set, alongside Earthshock, Remembrance of the Daleks and the TV movie. Alongside a documentary on the Sixth Doctor, the disc features the serial put together as a single feature in widescreen format with an introduction from then current show runner Steven Moffat, as well as its original version.

References

External links

Script to Screen: Vengeance on Varos, by Jon Preddle (Time Space Visualiser issue 41, October 1994)

Target novelisation

Doctor Who serials novelised by Philip Martin
Sixth Doctor serials
1985 British television episodes
Fiction set in the 24th century